Charles Mitchell was a songwriter, best known as a collaborator with Jimmie Davis. Davis's best-known composition, "You Are My Sunshine", published in 1939 was co-written by Mitchell.

References 

Year of birth missing
Year of death missing
American country singer-songwriters
American male singer-songwriters